Ivor Charlie Salter (22 August 1925 – 21 June 1991) was an English actor who appeared in character roles in numerous United Kingdom television productions and films from the early 1950s until the 1980s often appearing as a police constable.

His television appearances included; Doctor Who (The Space Museum, The Myth Makers and Black Orchid), The Saint, The Avengers, The Double Deckers (as the policeman), Danger Man Ghost Squad, Nearest and Dearest (as Snatcher Snelling), and On the Buses. Between 1978 and 1980 he appeared in the Midlands soap Crossroads as Bible Quoting Reg Cotterill. He played the character of Gobber Newhouse in three episodes of the BBC TV series All Creatures Great and Small.

Films included Be My Guest and House of Whipcord.

Filmography

References

External links

1925 births
1991 deaths
English male stage actors
English male film actors
English male television actors
People from Taunton
20th-century English male actors